The following article presents a summary of the 1949 football (soccer) season in Brazil, which was the 48th season of competitive football in the country.

Campeonato Paulista
Final Standings

São Paulo declared as the Campeonato Paulista champions.

Relegation
The worst placed team, which is Comercial-SP, was relegated to the following year's second level.

State championship champions

Brazil national team
The following table lists all the games played by the Brazil national football team in official competitions and friendly matches during 1949.

References

 Brazilian competitions at RSSSF
 1949 Brazil national team matches at RSSSF

 
Seasons in Brazilian football
Brazil